Clemens J. Setz (born 15 November 1982, in Graz), is an Austrian writer and translator.

He debuted in 2007 with the novel Söhne und Planeten. His second novel, Die Frequenzen, was shortlisted for the German Book Prize. He won the 2011 Leipzig Book Fair Prize with the short story collection Die Liebe zur Zeit des Mahlstädter Kindes. In 2012 he was again shortlisted for the German Book Prize for the novel Indigo, and in 2015 he received the Wilhelm Raabe Literature Prize for Die Stunde zwischen Frau und Gitarre.

He published literature translations into German of  John Leake: Entering Hades, Edward Gorey: (The Utter Zoo; The Hapless Child; The Osbick Bird) and Scott McClanahan: Sarah.

In 2020 he was awarded the Jakob-Wassermann-Literaturpreis and the prestigious Kleist Prize, in 2021 the Georg Büchner Prize.

Clemens J. Setz continues to live and work in Graz.

List of works
 Söhne und Planeten. Novel. Residenz, St. Pölten 2007. 
 Die Frequenzen. Novel. Residenz, St. Pölten 2009. 
 Die Liebe zur Zeit des Mahlstädter Kindes. Short stories. Suhrkamp, Berlin 2011. 
 Zeitfrauen. (Schöner Lesen Nr. 112.) SuKuLTuR, Berlin 2012. 
 Indigo. Novel. Suhrkamp, Berlin 2012. Published in English in 2014. 
 Die Vogelstraußtrompete. Poems. Suhrkamp, Berlin 2014. 
 Glücklich wie Blei im Getreide. Retellings. Suhrkamp, Berlin 2015. 
 Die Stunde zwischen Frau und Gitarre. Novel. Suhrkamp, Berlin 2015. 
 Verweilen unter schwebender Last. (Tübinger Poetik-Dozentur 2015, with Kathrin Passig), Essays, Lectures, Speeches. Swiridoff, Künzelsau 2016. 
 Der Trost runder Dinge. Short stories. Suhrkamp, Berlin 2019. 
Die Bienen und das Unsichtbare, Suhrkamp, Berlin 2020.

References

External links

 Publicity page at the German publisher's website 
 Publicity page at the American publisher's website

1982 births
21st-century Austrian novelists
21st-century Austrian poets
Austrian male short story writers
Austrian translators
Living people
Writers from Graz
Austrian male poets
Austrian male novelists
21st-century short story writers
21st-century male writers
21st-century translators
Georg Büchner Prize winners